Pimelea phylicoides, commonly known as heath rice-flower, is a species of flowering plant in the family Thymelaeaceae and is endemic to southern continental Australia. It is an erect shrub with densely hairy young stems, narrowly egg-shaped to elliptic leaves, and heads of white flowers surrounded by 3 to 6 involucral bracts.

Description
Both sides of the leaves are the same shade of green to dark bluish-green, the upper surface glabrous and the lower surface covered with fine, white hairs. Flowering mainly occurs from June to February.

Taxonomy and naming
Pimelea phylicoides was first formally described in 1848 by Carl Meissner in Lehmann's Plantae Preissianae. The specific epithet (petrophila) means "Phylica-like".

Distribution and habitat
Heath rice-flower usually grows in sandy soil in forest and heath, and is found in scattered populations from the Eyre Peninsula in South Australia to Melbourne in Victoria, with an isolated population on Wilsons Promontory.

References

phylicoides
Malvales of Australia
Flora of Victoria (Australia)
Flora of South Australia
Taxa named by Carl Meissner
Plants described in 1848